Soqiyeh (also Romanized as S̄oqīyeh, Soqīyeh, and Soqyeh) is a village in Beyhaq Rural District, Sheshtomad District, Sabzevar County, Razavi Khorasan Province, Iran. At the 2006 census, its population was 128, in 45 families.

References 

Populated places in Sabzevar County